Apagomerina gigas is a species of beetle in the family Cerambycidae. It was described by Martins and Galileo in 2007. It is known from Brazil.

References

gigas
Beetles described in 2007